Cybelopsis is a trilobite in the order Phacopida, that existed during the lower Ordovician in what is now Greenland. It was described by Poulsen in 1927, and the type species is Cybelopsis speciosa. The type locality for the genus was the Nunatami Formation.

References

External links
 Cybelopsis at the Paleobiology Database

Fossil taxa described in 1927
Pliomeridae
Early Ordovician trilobites of Europe
Fossils of Greenland
Paleozoic life of Alberta